The following is a list of notable boarding schools in the United Kingdom.

Many of the private schools in the United Kingdom are boarding schools, although nearly all also have day pupils.

There are also about 40 state boarding schools in England.

England and Wales

Northern Ireland
 Campbell College
 Rockport School
 The Royal School, Armagh
 Royal School Dungannon
 Victoria College, Belfast

Scotland

Defunct, or no longer boarding
Abbots Bromley School, Staffordshire
Blairmore School
Oak Bank School Leighton Buzzard
Keil School
Kilquhanity School
Mayfield College
Rannoch School
Methodist College Belfast
The Perse School
Silcoates School
Friends' School, Saffron Walden

 
Boarding
United Kingdom